Laurence Westgaph (born 28 February 1975), is a political activist and television presenter, specialising in Black British history and slavery.

Early years and education
Westgaph was born in Liverpool in 1975 to a mother of Nigerian descent and a Jamaican father. He grew up in the inner city area of Toxteth. His ancestors also hail from Barbados and he is a descendant of slave trader Robert Cox.

Westgaph left school at the age of 16. In 2008 he completed a Masters in Atlantic History at Liverpool University.

Career
Westgaph began work as a model in Liverpool. He invested his earnings in property in the deprived Toxteth area of Liverpool. Westgaph became a vocal campaigner for regeneration of the area, helping to introduce new business and housing developments into the area.

Westgaph was given a Black Achievers Award for his work raising the profile of the history of Liverpool. He had produced a pamphlet titled "Read the signs" examining the history of Liverpool street names.

Westgraph has appeared in a number of BBC TV and radio programmes. He worked on Inside Out and worked with Melvyn Bragg on the BBC Radio 4 programme The Routes of English, discussing slavery. He was part of a team who made a series for the History Channel in 2008 called 50 Things You Need To Know About British History. However it faced criticism for failing to include the likes of Winston Churchill and Queen Victoria. Westgaph also filmed a documentary for the History Channel titled Britain's Slavery Secrets, examining the history of the slave trade. Other figures he has worked with include John Peel and Trevor Phillips.

He is a founder member of the Liverpool Black Leadership Forum and is currently writing his first book and working on a PhD. He produced a guide to Liverpool's involvement in the Atlantic slave trade for Historic England and gives walking tours in Liverpool covering the topic. In 2020 he became the historian-in-residence at National Museums Liverpool, with the aim of supporting the group to become anti-racist.

Legal issues
In 2000 Westgaph was given a community order after being found to have had sex with a 15-year-old girl he had met at a club. He was given a community order due to the girl having given "every impression" of being older. In September 2009 he was convicted of grievous bodily harm after attacking a friend who had begun in a relationship with Westgaph's ex-partner. The victim was repeatedly punched and left with a broken eye socket as a result of the attack. Westgaph was given a nine-month jail sentence, suspended for two years.

Personal life
He had a relationship with Natalie Inge and they have a child.

References

English people of Nigerian descent
English historians
English people of Jamaican descent
People from Edge Hill
BBC television presenters
Living people
1975 births
English people of Barbadian descent
English people convicted of assault
21st-century British criminals